Kay Vosheh (also Romanized as Kāy Vosheh, Kāy Vasheh, and Kīvosheh; also known as Kāewasheh and Kā’ī Vacheh) is a village in Quri Chay Rural District, in the Central District of Dehgolan County, Kurdistan Province, Iran. At the 2006 census, its population was 58, in 12 families. The village is populated by Kurds.

References 

Towns and villages in Dehgolan County
Kurdish settlements in Kurdistan Province